Bright Lights is the fourth solo album by Susanna Hoffs. This is a covers album featuring songs originally performed by Badfinger, The Velvet Underground, and Big Star among others.  Hoffs stated, "These were songs I always admired and adored and had listened to on repeat for pure pleasure, but had never sung."

Ledger Line's Jonathan Keefe stated "Bright Lights reaffirms, then, is that Hoffs has some of the sharpest instincts in pop music."  

The album featured a cover of a Badfinger track with Aimee Mann.

Track listing

Personnel 
Susanna Hoffs – vocals, harmony vocals, tambourine
Aimee Mann – (track 4)
Danny Kortchmar – electric guitar
Waddy Wachtel – electric guitar
Leland Sklar – bass
Russell Kunkel – drums

References 

2021 albums
Susanna Hoffs albums
Covers albums